Maurice Noel Duggan (25 November 1922 - 11 December 1974) was a New Zealand writer of short fiction.

Life Overview
Born in Auckland and raised on the city’s North Shore, Duggan was mentored by Frank Sargeson and was friendly with many of the important writers of the day, including Greville Texidor, John Reece Cole, Keith Sinclair and Kendrick Smithyman.  He married Barbara Platts, a physiotherapist, in February 1946, and they had one son, Nicholas.

Duggan displayed no interest in literature as a child, but the loss of his left leg in 1940 through acute osteomyelitis generated his desire to write.  He later contracted tuberculosis while visiting Spain in late 1952.  In 1960 Duggan was the second recipient of the newly established Robert Burns Fellowship (the first was Ian Cross), which provided a writer with a lecturer's salary for one year at Otago University. During his year as Burns Fellow, Duggan worked on his unpublished novel The Burning Miss Bratby, and the short story 'Riley's Handbook.' From 1961 Duggan worked in advertising, eventually becoming a member of the Board of Directors of the firm, J. Inglis Wright.  He received the New Zealand Literary Fund Scholarship in 1966 and had a year free from advertising work to concentrate on fiction.  A crisis with alcoholism precipitated Duggan's resignation from advertising in late 1972, and after a period of painful but successful recovery he learned in late 1973 that he had contracted cancer.

Duggan was primarily a stylist.  His story 'Six Place Names and a Girl,' to which Sargeson contributed the title, was an early success, with its minimal plot and its brief, evocative descriptions of the Hauraki Plains.  It was published in Charles Brasch's quarterly, Landfall, in 1949, as was most of Duggan's later fiction.  In the early 1960s Duggan published two stories in Landfall, ‘Riley’s Handbook’ and ‘Along Rideout Road that Summer,’ which moved New Zealand literature decisively away from its long-dominant tradition of social realism.

Literary works

Short Story Collections 
Immanuel's Land (1956)
Summer in the Gravel Pit (1965)
O'Leary's Orchard (1970)
Collected Stories (1981) edited by C.K. Stead

Children’s Literature 
Falter Tom and the Water Boy (1957)
The Fabulous McFanes and Other Children’s Stories (1974)

Poetry 
A Voice for the Minotaur: Selected Poems (2001)

Unpublished Works 
The Burning Miss Bratby

References

To Bed at Noon: the Life and Art of Maurice Duggan (1997) by Ian Richards

External links
  in the Dictionary of New Zealand Biography
 New Zealand Book Council homepage
 University of Auckland New Zealand Literature File

New Zealand male short story writers
1922 births
1974 deaths